The Kinmon Gakuen (金門学園) or Golden Gate Institute is a Japanese language school in San Francisco, California, located at 2031 Bush Street. It was established in 1911 with 133 students. They currently offer programs to children from kindergarten to high school.

In 1927, the original art of Henry Yoshitaka Kiyama's Four Immigrants Manga was exhibited there.

The school was forced to close during World War II and was not able to reopen until 1949. It was visited by Japanese Emperor Hirohito in 1933 and 1935, and then-Crown Prince Akihito and Crown Princess Michiko in 1960. The institute celebrated the 100th anniversary of its establishment and received Japan's Foreign Minister's Commendation in 2011.

See also

Japanese language education in the United States
History of the Japanese in San Francisco

References

External links

Japanese-American culture in San Francisco
Educational institutions established in 1911
Schools in San Francisco
Western Addition, San Francisco
Japanese-language schools
Supplementary Japanese schools in the United States
1911 establishments in California